Kendriya Vidyalaya, (Hindi for Central School) is a school in Sundergarh providing education to the children of Central Government employees and other transferable employees of state govt. Ward of the autonomous bodies of central and state government employee can also study here. However, the priority is graded from I to V. Level V is anyone whose parents are not any employee. Since inception of Right to Education 25% seats are reserved for local students within the radius of 5 km. School fee and Vidyalaya Vikas Nidhi is collected from the students except for single girl child studying in class VI onwards for whom it is completely exempted. There are some partial exemptions too. The fee ranges from ₹1500 to ₹3100 per quarter (3 months) depending upon the class, category and subject opted. The school is affiliated to the Central Board of Secondary Education and the medium of instruction is English/Hindi.

It has classes from I to XII. In the Senior Secondary section, the school offers English core, physics, chemistry, biology/Computer Science, maths/Hindi core in science stream. It also provides commerce stream with Accountancy, Business Studies, Economics, Maths, Hindi, and English core. Food Nutrition and Dietetics as common subject for all. The minimum marks needed for admission in to commerce stream is 55% and for Science 60% excluding concessions as per kvs guidelines.

Purpose 
 To cater to the educational needs of children of transferable Central Government including defence and para-military personnel by providing a common programme of education.
 To promote experimentation and innovations in education in collaboration with other bodies like the Central Board of Secondary Education and the National Council of Educational Research and Training.

Sports and games 
The students are encouraged to participate in sports activities at different levels, namely:
 Within the Vidyalaya between the houses into which the students are divided
 Between two or more Vidyalayas at the cluster level
 Between clusters at the regional level
 Between region at the national level

See also 

 Kendriya Vidyalaya
 List of Kendriya Vidyalayas
 List of schools in Odisha

External links
Kendriya Vidyalaya Sangathan
Directory of Schools List in India States

Education in Sundergarh district
Kendriya Vidyalayas
Primary schools in India
High schools and secondary schools in Odisha
Educational institutions in India with year of establishment missing